Deportivo 18 de Marzo is a station on the Mexico City Metro. It is located in Mexico City's Gustavo A. Madero borough.

General information
The name of the station refers to the adjacent Deportivo 18 de Marzo sports complex, and its logo represents a player of a pre-Columbian ball game.

This station was previously known as Metro Basílica. Its logo and name were taken from the Basílica de Guadalupe Roman Catholic shrine, located one kilometer east of this station.  When the Metro authorities changed the name of Metro La Villa to Metro La Villa-Basílica (a station that is only two blocks far Basílica de Guadalupe) they also changed the name of Metro Basílica.

Metro Deportivo 18 de Marzo was originally to be named Metro Montevideo (from nearby Avenida Montevideo), according to early plans for Line 3, so this station has changed its name twice.

This station serves the Tepeyac Insurgentes and Lindavista neighbourhoods. It offers a connection to Line 1 of the Mexico City Metrobús. Service to this metro station along Metro Line 3 opened on 1 December 1979. Service along Line 6 at the station started on 8 July 1986.

Ridership

Nearby
Deportivo 18 de marzo, sports centre.
Basilica of Our Lady of Guadalupe, Roman Catholic church, basilica and National shrine.

Exits

Line 3
Northeast: Avenida de los Insurgentes Norte and Montiel street, Tepeyac Insurgentes
Southeast: Avenida de los Insurgentes Norte and Montiel street, Tepeyac Insurgentes
Northwest: Avenida de los Insurgentes Norte and Montiel street, Tepeyac Insurgentes

Line 6
Northwest: Avenida de los Insurgentes Norte and Avenida Ricarte, Lindavista
Avenida Ricarte and Avenida de los Insurgentes Norte, Tepeyac Insurgentes

Gallery

References 

Deportivo 18 de Marzo
Railway stations opened in 1979
1979 establishments in Mexico
Railway stations opened in 1986
1986 establishments in Mexico
Mexico City Metro stations in Gustavo A. Madero, Mexico City
Mexico City Metro Line 6 stations
Accessible Mexico City Metro stations